The King Fahad Dam, previously known as Bisha Dam, is a gravity dam on Wadi Bisha about  south of Bisha in the 'Asir Region of southwestern Saudi Arabia. The dam has many purposes to include flood control, municipal water supply, irrigation and groundwater recharge. The dam was constructed between 1986 and 1997. It is named after King Fahad and is managed by the Ministry of Water and Electricity. At  in height, it was the tallest dam in the country until the  Baysh Dam was completed in 2009.

See also 

 List of dams in Saudi Arabia

References

Dams completed in 1997
Dams in Saudi Arabia
'Asir Province
Gravity dams